Mario Šimić (born 28 December 1989) is a Croatian Australian footballer who plays for NK Oroslavje, who compete in the 2.ŽNL Krapina-Zagorje league, in Croatia.

Club career
Mario Šimić made his professional debut in the A-League on 2 February 2011 in a round 25 clash against Melbourne Victory coming off the bench in the 73rd minute of the game in a 2–0 loss. In September 2017, Mario signed with NK Oroslavje on a free transfer from NK Lučko.

References

1989 births
Living people
Australian soccer players
Newcastle Jets FC players
Sydney United 58 FC players
NK Lučko players
A-League Men players
Association football fullbacks